Baseball, Minnesota was a television documentary series on the FX Network. The show followed a minor league baseball team, the St. Paul Saints, through the 1996 season. Until the FX network's format change in 1997, this was the only television series that was neither live nor a rebroadcast of a syndicated series. The 22 episode series premiered on August 1996.

The soundtrack (including the theme song "Famous") was performed by rock group Ted's Lunch.

References

External links 
 
 A review from Giants Magazine

1996 American television series debuts
1997 American television series endings
1990s American documentary television series
FX Networks original programming
Television shows set in Minnesota
Sports in Saint Paul, Minnesota